Logan's Roadhouse is a chain of casual dining restaurants based in Houston, Texas, United States, founded in 1991 in Lexington, Kentucky, U.S. There are 135 Logan's Roadhouse locations throughout twenty-two states.

The chain uses retro style decorations. Some of the Logan's establishments have locality-inspired decor and artwork. For example, Detroit area Logan's have murals of people wearing Detroit Pistons shirts.  The chain's menu includes mesquite-grilled steaks, traditional American fare such as sandwiches, soup, salads, and seafood, longneck cold beer, and homemade yeast rolls.

History
In 1999 it became a wholly owned subsidiary of the publicly held CBRL Group, which also owns Cracker Barrel. On December 6, 2006, CBRL Group sold Logan's Roadhouse to affiliates of Bruckmann, Rosser, Sherrill & Co., Canyon Capital Advisors LLC, and Black Canyon Capital LLC for $486 million. In 2010, private equity firm Kelso & Company acquired the company.

On February 20, 2013, Mike Andres, a former McDonald's vice-president and former chief executive officer of Boston Market, replaced Tom Vogel as chief executive officer. On January 12, 2017, Hazem Ouf, former chief executive officer of American Blue Ribbon Holdings, was named president and chief executive officer.

On August 8, 2016, Logan's Roadhouse filed for bankruptcy and announced plans to close eighteen of its 256 locations that are under-performing. The chain was reported to be struggling with heavy debt and falling sales. Locations closing in late September 2016, include, in Florida, two each in Kissimmee & Orlando, and one each in Mary Esther, Tampa, and Tallahassee; one in each of those cities: Macon, Georgia; Houston, Texas; Lafayette, Louisiana & Waynesboro, Virginia.

On December 1, 2016, Logan's Roadhouse formally exited bankruptcy with a debt load reduced from about $400 million to $100 million.

On November 1, 2018, Logan's Roadhouse announced that it was acquired by CraftWorks Restaurants & Breweries.

On March 3, 2020, Craftworks filed for Chapter 11 Bankruptcy protection. On March 19, 2020, all open Logan's locations were temporarily closed amid the COVID-19 pandemic. On April 4, 2020, Craftworks announced that all the Logan's Roadhouse locations would remain closed indefinitely, and that all 18,000 employees would be laid off. 

On June 12, 2020, SPB Hospitality purchased Craftworks restaurants out of bankruptcy for $93 million.

References

External links
 

Steakhouses in the United States
Companies based in Houston
American corporate subsidiaries
1991 establishments in Kentucky
Restaurants established in 1991
Companies that filed for Chapter 11 bankruptcy in 2016
Companies that filed for Chapter 11 bankruptcy in 2020
1999 mergers and acquisitions
2006 mergers and acquisitions
2010 mergers and acquisitions
2018 mergers and acquisitions